In a static battle, both sides suffer heavy casualties and battlefronts move so slowly that the result is "static" (a lack of change). Movement is limited by the number of casualties.

Examples from history include:
 the Battle of Moyry Pass (Nine Years' War)
 the Battle of the Somme (World War I)
 the Battle of Ypres (World War I)
 the Battle of Stalingrad (World War II)

Battles